Alberto A. Picó (born August 23, 1918, in Coamo, Puerto Rico – September 4, 2003, in Mayagüez, Puerto Rico) was a military officer who became the 4th Puerto Rico Adjutant General.

Early years
After completing elementary and high school in his hometown, in 1938 he went to the University of Puerto Rico where he received his B.A. in arts and a commission of Second Lieutenant on May 29, 1940, thru the Army ROTC program.

Military career
During World War II he served in Puerto Rico, the United States and Europe from 1940 to 1946. Until 1944 he served as an intelligence officer and later moved to the front lines with the 13th Armored Division.

In 1947 went on to the Puerto Rico National Guard. Was called to serve active duty during the Korean War with the 296th Infantry Regiment. In 1951 went to the republic of Colombia to train Colombian troops to fight in the Korean War.

Was back in the Puerto Rico National Guard in 1953 as commander of the 3rd Battalion 296th Infantry Regiment. In 1960 became Commander of the First Battle Group of the 65th Infantry with the rank of Colonel.  On January 10, 1968, appointed Adjutant General of the National Guard of Puerto Rico by governor Luis A. Ferré and on March 3, 1968, he was promoted to the rank of General Brigadier. On August 10, 1970, he received another promotion to Major General.

Military awards and decorations
Among Roig's decorations are the following:

Death
Alberto A. Picó died on September 4, 2003, in Mayagüez, Puerto Rico.

References
1. Negroni, Hector Andres (1992). Historia militar de Puerto Rico. Coleccion Encuentros (in Spanish). Sociedad Estatal Quinto Centenario. .

1918 births
2003 deaths
People from Coamo, Puerto Rico
United States Army personnel of World War II
National Guard (United States) generals
Puerto Rican Army personnel
Puerto Rican military officers
Puerto Rico Adjutant Generals
Puerto Rico National Guard personnel
University of Puerto Rico alumni